Puncuyoc (possibly from Quechua punku door, -yuq a suffix, "the one with a door") is a mountain north of the Urubamba mountain range in the Andes of Peru, about  high. It is located in the Cusco Region, La Convención Province, Ocobamba District. Puncuyoc lies northeast of Llaulliyoc.

References

Mountains of Peru
Mountains of Cusco Region